Kavimani Desigavinayagam Pillai (27 July 1876 – 26 September 1954) was a Tamil poet born to Sivadhanu Pillai and Aadhilakshmi. He was born in the southern district of Tamil Nadu in Kanniyakumari district in a village called Theroor. Since the place was part of Travancore, he learnt Malayalam at School. He learnt Tamil in later years. The reference of his name is used in the name plate of the village. Asiya Jothi, Nanjil Nattu Marumakkal Vazhi Manmiyam, and the translation of the work of Omar Khayyam are his masterpieces. He also wrote "Varumun Kaappom' in his book 'Malarum Malayum'. He is known for his poetry. In 1940 the Tamil Sangam at its 7th annual conference held at Madras (now Chennai) honoured Desigavinayagam Pillai with the title "Kavimani". On 21 October 2005, he was commemorated on an Indian postage stamp.

References

External links

 They left behind their stamp, Chennaionline, Oct 2005

People from Kanyakumari district
Tamil poets
Indian Tamil people
1876 births
1954 deaths
19th-century Indian poets
20th-century Indian poets
Poets from Tamil Nadu